The Unified Metropolitan Transportation Authority or UMTA is the urban transportation planning agency of Hyderabad, Telangana, India. It was constituted in 2008 by an Act of the Andhra Pradesh legislature (G O Ms. No. 624).

In 2019, Municipal Administration and Urban Development (MA&UD) department, Telangana  decided to revive the Hyderabad Urban Metropolitan Transport Authority (HUMTA). HUMTA is a wing of Hyderabad Metropolitan Development Authority (HMDA). HUMTA acts as an umbrella for various agencies that are connected to traffic and transportation issues to ensure last-mile connectivity in Hyderabad.

See also 

Hyderabad Metropolitan Development Authority (HMDA)
Inner Ring Road, Hyderabad
Radial Roads, Hyderabad (India)
Elevated Expressways in Hyderabad
Intermediate Ring Road, Hyderabad (India)
Outer Ring Road, Hyderabad
Regional Ring Road
List of Flyovers in Hyderabad

References

External links
 

Organisations based in Hyderabad, India
State urban development authorities of India
Government of Hyderabad, India
2008 establishments in Andhra Pradesh
Transport in Hyderabad, India
Metropolitan transport agencies of India